Lagynias was a genus of flowering plants in the family Rubiaceae but is no longer recognized. In 2005, it was sunk into synonymy with Vangueria, based on a phylogenetic study of DNA sequences.

Species
 Lagynias dryadum (S.Moore) Robyns
 Lagynias lasiantha (Sond.) Bullock
 Lagynias monteiroi (Oliv.) Bridson
 Lagynias pallidiflora Bullock
 Lagynias rufescens (E.A.Bruce) Verdc.

See also
 Cuviera

References

External links
 World Checklist of Rubiaceae

Historically recognized Rubiaceae genera
Flora of Africa
Vanguerieae
Taxonomy articles created by Polbot